Ida is a surname. Notable people with the surname include:

Antoinette Nana Djimou Ida (born 1985), French-Cameroonian heptathlete
, Japanese cricketer
Ibrahim M. Ida (born 1949), Nigerian politician
James Ida (born 1940), New York gangster
Joseph Ida (1890–?), American gangster and head of the Philadelphia mob in the 1940s and 1950s
, Japanese lieutenant colonel who conspired to overthrow the government near the end of World War II
, Japanese curler

Japanese-language surnames